Mahavishnu is an album by the Mahavishnu Orchestra, released in 1984 by Warner Bros. Records.  During the 1980s, John McLaughlin reformed the Mahavishnu Orchestra for release of the two albums Mahavishnu and Adventures in Radioland. This band's overall sound was radically different from the original Mahavishnu Orchestra, in particular because of McLaughlin's extensive use of the Synclavier synthesiser system. This album features original Mahavishnu Orchestra drummer Billy Cobham.

Track listing 
All songs written by John McLaughlin, except where noted.

Personnel

Mahavishnu Orchestra
John McLaughlin - Synclavier II, Digital Guitar, Les Paul Special
Mitchel Forman - Fender Rhodes, Yamaha DX7, Yamaha "Blow Torch" Piano on "Clarendon Hills"
Jonas Hellborg - Fretless Bass Guitar, Fretted bass guitar
Bill Evans - Tenor Saxophone, Soprano Saxophone, Flute
Billy Cobham - Drums, Percussion

Additional personnel
Danny Gottlieb - Percussion
Hari Prasad Chaurasia - Flute on "When Blue Turns Gold"
Zakir Hussain - Tabla on "When Blue Turns Gold"
Katia Labeque - Synclavier II with Velocity/Pressure Keyboard (VPK), Yamaha DX7, and Acoustic Piano on "When Blue Turns Gold"

Production
Executive Producer: Albert Koski
Arranged & Produced By John McLaughlin
Engineered By Jean Louis Rizet; assisted by Laurent Peyron
Mixed By Brian Risner & Jean-Louis Riset

References

1984 albums
Mahavishnu Orchestra albums
Wounded Bird Records albums